This page lists the World Best Year Performances in the year 1983 in the Men's hammer throw. One of the main events during this season were the inaugural World Championships in Helsinki, Finland, where the final of the men's competition was held on Tuesday August 9, 1983. (The women did not compete in the hammer throw until the early 1990s.)

Records

1983 World Year Ranking

References
apulanta
hammerthrow.wz

1983
Hammer Throw Year Ranking, 1983